Aanhouden Doet Overwinnen 1920, simply known as ADO '20, is a Dutch association football club from Heemskerk, North Holland. They are currently playing in the Dutch Derde Divisie. The club was founded on 15 May 1920 as Aanhouden Doet Overwinnen 1920. The home games are played at Sportpark de Vlotter.

In February 2007, ADO '20 entered into a partnership with AZ Alkmaar in the field of youth development, knowledge exchange and scouting. This partnership has enabled ADO '20 to improve its youth academy. The most renowned youth prospect of the ADO '20 academy has been Jeffrey Gouweleeuw, who also played professionally for AZ. His move to German Bundesliga club FC Augsburg in January 2016 meant, that ADO '20 received a development fee which was used for renovating the main stand on Sportpark de Vlotter, since named the "Jeffrey Gouweleeuw Stand". In February 2018, ADO '20 entered into a partnership with Ajax.

The main rival of ADO '20 is ODIN '59, who also come from Heemskerk.

References 

Football clubs in the Netherlands
Football clubs in Heemskerk
Association football clubs established in 1920
1920 establishments in the Netherlands